Lissospira abyssicola is a species of sea snail, a marine gastropod mollusk in the family Skeneidae.

Description
The size of the shell attains 2.5 mm. In its general appearance this marine species resembles a true Lissospira, but the umbilical chink is channeled and defined by a raised thread and the aperture is modified by the body whorl to which the peritreme is more attached than in a typical species. It is similar in form to Lissospira dalli but larger, without sculpture and with the columellar lip less flattened.

Distribution
This species occurs in the Eastern Atlantic Ocean off Georges Bank at a depth of 1790 m.

References

External links
 To Encyclopedia of Life
 To World Register of Marine Species

abyssicola
Gastropods described in 1897